Jason C. Knapp (born August 31, 1990) is a former professional baseball pitcher.

Career
Knapp grew up in Clinton Township, New Jersey and attended North Hunterdon High School. The Philadelphia Phillies drafted Knapp in the second round of the 2008 Major League Baseball Draft.  He quickly became a top prospect in the Phillies organization. In 2009, he was traded to the Cleveland Indians along with Carlos Carrasco, Lou Marson and Jason Donald for Cliff Lee and Ben Francisco. The Indians considered Knapp the key to the deal, and would not trade Lee without receiving Knapp.

Coming into the 2010 season, Knapp was rated the 64th best prospect in baseball by Baseball America. However, he missed the 2011 season due to injury. After his second shoulder surgery, the Indians released Knapp in 2012.

Knapp began to attempt a comeback. He signed with the Texas Rangers, and was assigned to the Myrtle Beach Pelicans of the Class A-Advanced Carolina League.

References

External links

1990 births
Living people
Baseball pitchers
Baseball players from New Jersey
North Hunterdon High School alumni
People from Clinton Township, New Jersey
People from Westwood, New Jersey
Lakewood BlueClaws players
Lake County Captains players
Florida Complex League Phillies players
Arizona League Indians players
Myrtle Beach Pelicans players
Sportspeople from Hunterdon County, New Jersey